Hočevje is a village in the Municipality of Dobrepolje in Slovenia. The area is part of the historical region of Lower Carniola. The municipality is now included in the Central Slovenia Statistical Region.

The local church is dedicated to Saint Joseph and belongs to the parish of Dobrepolje–Videm. It was built in the 17th century.

References

External links
Hočevje at Geopedia

Populated places in the Municipality of Dobrepolje